Anna Rose Holmer (née Farrell) is an American director and writer. She began her career in the camera department before directing her feature debut The Fits (2015). She collaborated with Saela Davis on the Irish film God's Creatures (2022).

Early life
Holmer was born in Pawling, New York. She was raised by her mother, an art teacher, and her father, a piano tuner. She attended Oakwood Friends School in Poughkeepsie. She was introduced to film as a teenager through a photography workshop in Maine. She went on to study Film with a concentration in Cinematography at NYU Tisch School of the Arts, graduating in 2007.

Career
In 2014 Holmer pitched the idea of her film The Fits to Biennale College Cinema. She was awarded a grant and proceeded to make her film on a microbudget. The film premiered at the 72nd Venice International Film Festival in 2015 and then went on to play at the 2016 Sundance Film Festival where it was acquired for distribution by Oscilloscope Laboratories.

Holmer directed the music video for James Blake's "My Willing Heart" featuring Natalie Portman.

References

External links
 

Living people
Film producers from New York (state)
Screenwriters from New York (state)
American women screenwriters
People from Pawling, New York
New York University alumni
Film directors from New York (state)
American women film producers
Year of birth missing (living people)
21st-century American women